Marcus Minshall (died 1970) was a Trinidadian cricketer. He played in nine first-class matches for Trinidad and Tobago from 1958 to 1963.

See also
 List of Trinidadian representative cricketers

References

External links
 

Year of birth missing
1970 deaths
Trinidad and Tobago cricketers